Chalcoplia is a genus of beetles in the family Buprestidae, containing the following species:

 Chalcoplia auripilis Obenberger, 1922
 Chalcoplia braunsi Obenberger, 1922
 Chalcoplia damarana Kerremans, 1909
 Chalcoplia gebhardti Obenberger, 1928
 Chalcoplia jakovlevi Obenberger, 1928
 Chalcoplia lateralis (Olivier, 1790)
 Chalcoplia mackieae Théry, 1937
 Chalcoplia metallica (Gory & Laporte, 1839)
 Chalcoplia nigritula Kerremans, 1909
 Chalcoplia plicata (Wiedemann, 1823)
 Chalcoplia serripennis (Laporte & Gory, 1836)
 Chalcoplia strandi Obenberger, 1936
 Chalcoplia subcostata (Laporte & Gory, 1836)
 Chalcoplia thoracica Kerremans, 1903
 Chalcoplia transvalensis Obenberger, 1922
 Chalcoplia wiedemanni Obenberger, 1922

References

Buprestidae genera